Radosław Matusiak (born 1 January 1982) is a Polish international footballer who most recently played for Widzew Łódź.

Career

Club
Matusiak's contribution at the senior national team level caught the eyes of a handful of clubs in Europe during the winter transfer window. Speculation of the Polish striker joining Italian side U.S. Città di Palermo, third-placed in the Serie A league at the time, was finally realized, when on 30 January 2007 he was announced with the rosanero, after having signed a 3.5-year contract with the Sicilian club worth nearly 2 million euros. After a couple of substitute appearances, Matusiak made his debut in the starting lineup on 13 May 2007 in a league match against Ascoli, promptly scoring his first Serie A goal.

On 24 August 2007 Matusiak signed a three-year contract with an option for a fourth with Dutch side SC Heerenveen. In January 2008, however, he returned to Poland, being loaned for the duration of the season to Wisła Kraków. In the summer of 2008 his contract with Heerenveen was canceled by mutual agreement. He spent the first half of the 2008–09 season pursuing interests outside of football but rejected media reports that he had retired from the sport. On 23 December 2008 he signed with Widzew Łódź, and since 21 August 2009 he has played for Cracovia Krakow, signing a two-year contract. On 18 January 2011 he signed a contract with Asteras Tripoli. After that unlucky period in Greece, in February 2012 he returned to his old club – Widzew Łódź. He became a free agent at the end of the 2011–12 season.

International 
Matusiak was part of the Polish U-16 team which placed second at Euro U-16 Cup in 1999. In 2006, he got his first senior international cap. He got his first senior goal on 6 September 2006 in a Euro 2008 qualifier against Serbia. On 15 November he also scored the only goal in a qualification match against Belgium in Brussels, keeping alive his country's hopes of qualifying.

Poland Goals

References

External links
 
 National team stats on pzpn.pl 

1982 births
Living people
Polish footballers
Wisła Kraków players
GKS Bełchatów players
Wisła Płock players
ŁKS Łódź players
Palermo F.C. players
Asteras Tripolis F.C. players
Expatriate footballers in Italy
SC Heerenveen players
MKS Cracovia (football) players
Widzew Łódź players
Expatriate footballers in the Netherlands
Expatriate footballers in Greece
Eredivisie players
Serie A players
Ekstraklasa players
Super League Greece players
Polish expatriate footballers
Polish expatriate sportspeople in Italy
Poland international footballers
Poland youth international footballers
Footballers from Łódź
Association football forwards